David, Dave, or Dai Thomas may refer to:

Arts
 Dave Thomas (actor) (born 1949), Canadian actor and comedian
 David A. Thomas (voice actor) (born 1955), American voice actor and painter
 David Thomas (composer) (1881–1928), Welsh composer
 David Thomas (musician) (born 1953), American musician, member of group Pere Ubu
 David Thomas (Dewi Hefin) (1828–1909), Welsh poet and schoolteacher
 David Thomas (bass) (born 1943), British early-music and baroque-music singer
 David St John Thomas (1929–2014), English publisher and writer
 David Vaughan Thomas (1873–1934), composer, organist, pianist and music administrator
 David Thomas (born 1959), English author, better known under his pen name Tom Cain
 David Thomas, pen name of Dave Thompson (author) (born 1960), English writer about music
 David Thomas (born 1966), musician with Take 6
 Dave Thomas (born 1936), stage name of broadcaster and weatherman Dave Roberts (David Boreanaz) when he was at WKBW-TV Buffalo and hosted Rocketship 7 and Dialing for Dollars.

Business
 David Thomas (British businessman) (born 1963), British businessman, CEO of Barratt Developments
 David Thomas (industrialist) (1794–1882), Welsh industrialist
 D. A. Thomas (David Alfred Thomas, 1856–1918), Welsh industrialist and politician
 David A. Thomas (software developer), Canadian software technology figure
 Dave Thomas (businessman) (1932–2002), founder, former chairman & spokesperson of the North American Wendy's fast-food chain
 David Chandler Thomas (born 1954), American economist and technology executive

Politics
 David Thomas (New York politician) (1762–1831), American politician, Congressman from New York
 David Thomas (Texas politician) (1795–1836), American politician, signer of Texas Declaration of Independence
 David Thomas (British politician) (1892–1954), Welsh Labour politician
 David Thomas (MEP) (born 1955), British Labour politician
 David L. Thomas (born 1949), American politician, South Carolina state Senator
 Dave Thomas (politician) (born 1965), American politician from Alabama

Religion
 David Thomas (archdeacon of Montgomery) (1833–1916), Welsh priest and historian
 David Thomas (archdeacon of Cardigan) (died 1951), Welsh priest
 David Thomas (missionary priest) (1829–1905), Welsh priest
 David Thomas (Protestant minister, born 1813) (1813–1894), Welsh preacher and publisher
 David Thomas (bishop) (1942–2017), Welsh bishop, Provincial Assistant Bishop for the Church in Wales
 David Thomas (archdeacon of Gower), Welsh Anglican priest

Science
 David Thomas (Canadian scientist), Canadian biochemist
 David Thomas (geographer) (born 1958), British geographer
 David Gilbert Thomas (1928–2015), British-American chemist and physicist
 David Hurst Thomas (born 1945), American archaeologist
 David A. Thomas (academic) (born 1956), American academic and psychologist
 Dave Thomas (skeptic) (born 1953), American physicist and mathematician known for his scientific skepticism
 Dave Thomas (programmer) (born 1956), British-American computer programmer and writer

Sports

Association football
 Dai Thomas (footballer, born 1975), Welsh footballer
 Dave Thomas (footballer, born 1917) (1917–1991), English footballer
 Dai Thomas (footballer, born 1926) (1926–2014), Swansea City A.F.C. and Welsh international footballer
 Dave Thomas (footballer, born 1950), English footballer
 Lyn Thomas (footballer) (David Stuart Lynne Thomas, 1920–1993), Welsh footballer

Rugby
 David John Thomas (1879–1925), Welsh international rugby player
 David Thomas (rugby league), rugby league footballer of the 1900s for Wales, Halifax, and Mid-Rhondda
 Dai Thomas (rugby league) (1879–1958), rugby league footballer of the 1900s for Other Nationalities, and Oldham
 Dai Thomas (rugby union) (1909–?), Welsh international rugby player
 Dave Thomas (rugby union) (born 1988), New Zealand rugby player

Cricket
 David Thomas (cricketer, born 1911) (1911–2001), Welsh cricketer
 David Thomas (cricketer, born 1959) (1959–2012), English cricketer
 David Thomas (cricketer, born 1963), former English cricketer

Gridiron football
 David Thomas (American football) (born 1983), American football tight end
 David Thomas (Canadian football) (born 1951), American football cornerback
 Dave Thomas (cornerback) (born 1968), American football cornerback

Other sports
 Dave Thomas (baseball) (1905–1968), Negro league baseball player
 David Thomas (beach volleyball) (born 1974), Trinidad and Tobago beach volleyball player
 David Thomas (boxer) (born 1937), British Olympic boxer
 David Thomas (field hockey) (born 1927), British Olympic hockey player
 Dave Thomas (basketball) (born 1976), Canadian basketball player
 Dave Thomas (golfer) (1934–2013), Welsh golfer

Other
 David Cuthbert Thomas (1896–1916), Welsh soldier of the First World War
 David Winton Thomas (1901–1970), professor of Hebrew
 David A. Thomas (academic) (born 1956), President of Morehouse College
 David Thomas (educationalist) (1880–1967), Welsh educationalist and politician
 David A. Thomas (educator) (1917–2004), American educator and the seventh Dean of the Johnson School at Cornell
 David Oswald Thomas (1924–2005), Welsh philosopher
 David N. Thomas (born 1945), Welsh writer
 David Thomas (murderer) (died 1995), executed Vincentian criminal
 David M. Thomas Jr. (fl. 1981–present), officer in the United States Navy
 David Thomas (jeweller) (born 1942), Crown Jeweller for the English monarchy
 David Thomas (judge), Justice of the Supreme Court of Queensland
 J. David Thomas (born 1931), papyrologist and classical scholar

See also
 
 Davyd Thomas (born 1956), Deputy Chief of Navy, Royal Australian Navy
 David Clayton-Thomas (born 1941), musician and lead singer of Blood, Sweat & Tears
 Thomas (surname)